Glückauf was a German ship that represented a major step forward in oil tanker design. "When the Glückauf sailed from the Tyne on 10 July 1886 she was the first ocean going tanker with oil to her skin". The vessel was in use from 1886 to 25 March 1893, when it ran aground at Fire Island in New York.

The 2700-ton tanker was built at the Armstrong Mitchell yard, Walker, Newcastle upon Tyne,  Britain, with eight compartments for the cargo.  It was the first ship in which oil could be pumped directly into the vessel hull instead of being loaded in barrels or drums.  (Other sources give the gross tonnage in the 2300s.)

It was built for Wilhelm Anton Riedemann's shipping firm in Geestemünde and ran mostly as a tramp steamer.

Glückauf was on a charter voyage for the Standard Oil Company when it ran aground across from Sayville, New York at Blue Point Beach on Fire Island along Long Island.  Differing sources give the date of the wreck as March 23, 24, or 25, in 1892 or 1893; a contemporary New York Times article said that it ran aground "just before dawn" on March 24, 1893.  Men from the Blue Point Life-Saving Station rescued the crew.  On April 7, it was briefly dislodged and was being pulled out to sea when the hawser broke; the ship ran permanently aground.

The wreck quickly became a tourist attraction, and scavengers ripped up whatever they could and carried it away.

References

1886 ships
Maritime incidents in 1893
Fire Island, New York
Oil tankers
Ships built on the River Tyne
Shipwrecks of the New York (state) coast
Steamships of Germany
Ships built by Armstrong Whitworth